Ore Kadal is a 2007 Malayalam film written and directed by Shyamaprasad. The film is based on Sunil Gangopadhyay’s novel Hirak Deepthi. The film examines the extra-marital relationship between an intellectual economist and a housewife. It stars Mammootty, Meera Jasmine, Narain and Ramya Krishnan.

Ore Kadal was chosen as the inaugural film of the Indian Panorama section at the International Film Festival of India. Ouseppachan won the National Award for the Best Music Director for Ore Kadal.

Plot

The film is based on Sunil Gangopadhyay’s novel Hirak Deepthi. Dr. S.R. Nathan (Mammootty) is a 52-year old world-renowned professor of economics. A theorist to the core, he always harps on his pet topics of poverty and developmental issues that concern the developing world. He is a loner who is a drunkard, who drinks up to 10 bottles of liquor a day. He is also a chain smoker who smokes up to 25 boxes of cigarettes. Sometimes he's close with pornography, one-night stands, stocking condoms at home, walking naked in the house, masturbation and even hires female prostitutes to come to his house to have sex during stress.  He also uses different types of illegal drugs. Sometimes he would faint in the corridor due to heavy drinking and sniffing of cocaine and he regularly goes to the hospital.

His close friend Bela (Ramya Krishnan) is more practical. She tries to identify herself with some of the stark realities of life.

Deepti (Meera Jasmine) is a housewife who stays in the same apartment complex with her husband (Narain) and son. Her husband is on the lookout for a job. On his persuasion, Deepti approaches Nathan.

Their chance encounter ends up in a complex relationship. But Nathan is unperturbed and quite unmindful of his ways. While Deepthi gets a feeling of guilt, Nathan just shoos it away. In fact, he is working on a book on middle-class attitudes and notions. Yet, when confronted with real questions, Nathan loses ground — a reference to the pseudo-intellectual image. Nathan urges Deepti to have sex with him, but she strictly refuses, saying that she is already married. Then, both of them had fights regularly and did not talk to each other, with Deepti thinking that Nathan is a weirdly acting man.

Here, the director closely examines the disturbing relationship between two individuals. Deepthi is not able to pull herself away from Nathan. However, Deepti gets to know about all the bad habits of Nathan and tries to pull herself away from him. But, she realises love and affection growing towards Nathan.

The undercurrents in the minds of Deepti and Nathan, their tormented souls as turbulent as the sea, are captured on frame dexterously by Alagappan, the cameraman. Though the film does not give any direct message, it does hint at what makes or breaks a relationship.

Cast
Mammootty as Dr. S. R. Nathan
Meera Jasmine as Deepti
Narain as Jayakumar, Deepti's Husband
Ramya Krishnan as Bela, Nathan's close friend
 Sindhu Shyam

Soundtrack

The soundtrack features five songs composed by Ouseppachan and lyrics penned by Gireesh Puthenchery. All songs and background music is composed in the Carnatic raga Shubhapantuvarali. Syamaprasad told Ouseppachan that this movie's mood is serious. So he composed the music in that raga. The soundtrack earned Ouseppachan the National Film Award for Best Music Direction.

Film festival participation
IFFI Indian Panorama, 2007
Asiatic – Rome, 2008
Fribourg International Film Festival, Switzerland, 2008
Indian Film Festival of Los Angeles, 2008
International Film Festival of Minneapolis, 2008
Cine Del Sur, Granada, Spain, 2008
Stuttgart Festival of Bollywood and Beyond, July 2008
Festival of Malayalam Films, Vollodoid, Spain, June 2008
International Film Festival of Kerala, 2007
Hyderabad International Film Fest
Pune International Film Festival
MAMI Festival, Mumbai
Habitat Film Festival, New Delhi
Asian Film Festival, Abudhabi

Awards
At the 55th National Film Awards according to Sibi Malayil, one of the jury member of feature film, Meera Jasmine was one of the front runners for National Film Award for Best Actress, along with Jyothika for the Tamil film Mozhi and Umashree for the Kannada film Gulabi Talkies. However, she lost the award to Umashree who was adjudged the Best Actress.

National Film Awards
 National Film Award for Best Feature Film in Malayalam
 Best Music Direction - Ouseppachan

Kerala State Awards 2007
 Second Best Film - Ore Kadal
 Best Actress - Meera Jasmine
 Best Background Score - Ouseppachan
 Best Editor - Vinod Sukumaran

Filmfare Awards South
 Filmfare Award for Best Actress - Malayalam  - Meera Jasmine
 Filmfare Award for Best Female Playback Singer – Malayalam  - Shweta Mohan

Dubai Amma Awards 2007
 Best Movie - Ore Kadal
 Best Actor - Mammootty
 Best Actress - Meera Jasmine
 Best Supporting Actress - Ramya Krishnan
 Best Camera Man - Azhakappan
 Best Music Director - Ouseppachan

IFFK 2007 Awards
 NETPAC Award for the Best Malayalam Film
 Fipresci Award for the Best Malayalam Film

Asianet Film Award 2007
 Best Actor award - Mammootty
 Best Actress award - Meera Jasmine

Film Critics Award 2007
 Best Movie
 Best Director
 Best Female Singer
 Best Camera man
 Best Sound Recorder

Vanitha Film Award 2007
 Best Actor- Mammootty
 Best Actress - Meera Jasmine

FOKANA Film Award 2007
 Best Actor - Mammootty
 Best Actress - Meera Jasmine

Sify Award 2007
 Best Movie - Ore Kadal
 Best Actor - Mammootty
 Best Actress - Meera Jasmine

Amrita Film Awards 2007
 Best Director - Shyamaprasad
 Best Actor - Mammootty
 Best Actress - Meera Jasmine
 Best Supporting Actress - Ramya Krishnan
 Best Music Director - Ouseppachan
 Best Female Singer - Shweta Mohan

Others
 John Abraham Award for Best Malayalam Film - Ore Kadal
V.Santharam National Award for the Best Actress - Meera Jasmine
 First Sreevidya Award for Best Actress - Meera Jasmine
Bollywood & Beyond 2008 (Stuttgart, Germany): Audience Best Film Award for Ore Kadal

References

External links 

 http://www.shyamaprasad.info
Ore Kadal on Indian Auteur

2000s Malayalam-language films
2007 films
Films scored by Ouseppachan
Films directed by Shyamaprasad
Films based on Indian novels
Best Malayalam Feature Film National Film Award winners